Reuben Cotter (born 28 December 1998) is an Australian professional rugby league footballer who plays as a ,  and  for the North Queensland Cowboys in the NRL and Australia at international level. 

He has played at representative level for Queensland in State of Origin .

Background
Cotter was born in Mackay, Queensland, Australia, and is of German Jewish and Torres Strait Islander descent.

He played his junior rugby league for the Sarina Crocs and attended Sarina State High School. In 2011, he captained the Central Queensland NRL bid under-13 side against Keebra Park State High School, and later joined the North Queensland Cowboys academy.

Playing career

Early career
In 2013 and 2014, Cotter played for the Mackay Cutters' Cyril Connell Cup side. In February 2014, he represented the Queensland Murri under-16 side in their 18–14 win over New South Wales. In May 2014, he captained the Queensland under-16 side in their 20–18 win over New South Wales.

In 2015, Cotter moved up to the Cutters' Mal Meninga Cup side and later that year was selected at hooker in the Queensland under-18 side that defeated New South Wales 22–18. In September 2015, Cotter was selected for the Australian Schoolboys side that played a touring New Zealand under-18 team. He scored a try in the first Test, which Australia won 70–24.

In 2016, Cotter joined the North Queensland Cowboys under-20 side, playing just two games before tearing his anterior cruciate ligament (ACL), ruling him out for the season. In January 2017, he returned from his injury and was named in the Queensland under-20 Emerging Origin squad. He tore his ACL again in 2017, and subsequently missed the entire 2017 and 2018 seasons.

2019
In 2019, Cotter joined the North Queensland Cowboys NRL squad as a development player. On 23 February, he played his first game in almost two years in North Queensland's pre-season trial win over the Gold Coast Titans at Sunshine Coast Stadium. Cotter started the 2019 season playing for the Cowboys' Queensland Cup affiliate, the Mackay Cutters, where he scored nine tries in 15 games.

In Round 13 of the 2019 NRL season, Cotter made his NRL debut in the North Queensland Cowboys 20–22 loss to the Manly-Warringah Sea Eagles at 1300SMILES Stadium. He finished his rookie season playing five games, all off the bench.

On 4 September, Cotter signed a one-year contract extension with the North Queensland Cowboys.

2020
Cotter began the 2020 season playing for the Mackay Cutters, scoring two tries in a 22–23 loss to the Norths Devils. After returning to the North Queensland side in Round 5, he played four games off the bench. In Round 15, he started at hooker for the first time replacing the injured Reece Robson. He finished the season as the club's starting hooker, playing six games in the position.

On 30 September, Cotter re-signed with the North Queensland side until the end of the 2022 season.

2021
Cotter made only six appearances for the North Queensland club in the 2021 NRL season as they finished 15th on the table.

2022
In June, Cotter was selected for game one of the 2022 State of Origin series which Queensland won 16-10 at Stadium Australia.  Cotter played 18 matches for North Queensland in the 2022 NRL season as the club finished third on the table and qualified for the finals.  Cotter played in both finals matches including their preliminary final loss to Parramatta, scoring a try in the 24-20 loss.

In October he was named in the Australia squad for the 2021 Rugby League World Cup.

Statistics

NRL
 Statistics as at 1 June 2022

References

External links

North Queensland Cowboys profile
NRL profile

1998 births
Living people
Australia national rugby league team players
Australian rugby league players
Indigenous Australian rugby league players
North Queensland Cowboys players
Queensland Rugby League State of Origin players
Mackay Cutters players
Rugby league hookers
Rugby league players from Mackay, Queensland
Rugby league locks
Rugby league props